HMS Trenchant was a  nuclear-powered fleet submarine of the Royal Navy built by Vickers Shipbuilding, Barrow-in-Furness. Trenchant was based at HMNB Devonport. She was the third vessel and the second submarine of the Royal Navy to be named for the characteristic of vigour and incisiveness.

The submarine was ordered on 22 March 1983. She was laid down by Vickers Shipbuilding on 28 October 1985, and was launched on 3 November 1986 in the presence of Vice Admiral Sir Arthur Hezlet, who had commanded the World War II T-class submarine . She was commissioned into the Royal Navy on 14 January 1989.

Following the Integrated Review of 2020, Trenchant left active service in 2021 and formally decommissioned in May 2022.

Operational history

1990-1999
On 22 November 1990, the nets of the trawler  were snagged by Trenchant in the Bute Sound in Scotland. At the time the submarine was conducting a 'Perisher' Submarine Command Course exercise in company with the frigate . Antares was pulled under with the loss of all four members of the crew. A subsequent Marine Accident Investigation found that the accident had been caused by "a partial breakdown in both the structure and the standards of watchkeeping on board Trenchant".

In July 1997, the submarine ran aground off the western coast of Australia. Trenchant was able to free herself, and an inspection by divers reported no significant damage.

Trenchant tested the non-hull-penetrating optronic mast in 1998. She also trialled a camouflage paint scheme comprising jagged shapes of various colours, including pale blue.

2000–2022

On 21 June 2007, the submarine became the first Royal Navy vessel to fire the new Block IV Tomahawk cruise missile in a live-firing trial in the Gulf of Mexico off the United States coast.

In late 2009, Trenchant entered the Devonport submarine refit complex to undertake a 2-year refit and upgrade programme. Upon completion of the programme, the submarine underwent a rededication service on 6 June 2011 to welcome the boat back to active service.

On 22 May 2013, Trenchant completed the longest patrol ever carried out by a Royal Navy SSN. The patrol lasted 335 days (11 months) during which the submarine sailed . During this time the vessel visited six different ports: Fujairah, UAE; the British Indian Ocean Territory – Diego Garcia; the Kingdom of Bahrain; Aqaba, Jordan; Souda Bay, Crete; and Gibraltar.

Following a maintenance period involving a weapon and sensors upgrade, Trenchant returned to service in August 2016.

This was the first time a Royal Navy submarine participated in ICEX since 2007.

In April 2020 a Royal Navy investigation was opened into videos of sailors having a party while under lockdown. The submarine had returned to Devonport for repairs and the crew were required to stay on board in isolation while repairs were completed because of COVID-19 restrictions. It was confirmed that some sailors were drinking alcohol and it was reported that the captain had approved the party despite being advised that it might be inappropriate. The captain was sent home and later relieved of his command, and moved to another role within the Navy.

Trenchants final four-month deployment in the Atlantic was filmed for a Channel 5 television documentary called Submarine: Life Beneath the Waves, which was first shown in the United Kingdom in September 2021. On 25 March 2021 she sailed into Plymouth for the last time, flying her decommissioning pennant, ahead of decommissioning later.

Affiliations
Trenchant is affiliated with the following military and civilian organisations, bodies & individuals:

 Sea Cadet unit TS St David’s
 Sea Cadet unit TS Echo (Llanelli)
 Town of Llanelli
 Lady Meriel Hunt (sponsor)

References

Bibliography

External links
 Royal Navy HMS Trenchant (royalnavy.mod.uk)

 

Trafalgar-class submarines
Ships built in Barrow-in-Furness
1986 ships
Cold War submarines of the United Kingdom
Submarines of the United Kingdom
Maritime incidents in 1990